The men's 4 × 400 metres relay event at the 2000 Asian Athletics Championships was held in Jakarta, Indonesia on 31 August.

Results

References

2000 Asian Athletics Championships
Relays at the Asian Athletics Championships